Takemitsu Uranishi (born 10 October 1940) is a Japanese professional golfer.

Uranishi played on the Japan Golf Tour, winning once.

Professional wins (1)

Japan Golf Tour wins (1)

Other wins
1979 Wakayama Open

References

External links

Takemitsu Uranishi at the PGA of Japan official website (in Japanese)

Japanese male golfers
Japan Golf Tour golfers
1940 births
Living people